Noel L. Hamiel (born December 24, 1947) is an American former politician. He has served as a Republican member for the 20th district in the South Dakota House of Representatives from 2009 to 2010. He was a career newspaperman who was elected to the South Dakota Newspaper Hall of Fame in 2012.

References

1947 births
Living people
People from Chamberlain, South Dakota
Journalists from South Dakota
Republican Party members of the South Dakota House of Representatives